Columbian is the adjective form of Columbia. It may refer to:

Buildings
 The Columbian Theatre, a music hall in northeastern Kansas
 The Columbian (Chicago), a building in Illinois

Published works
 The Columbian, a daily newspaper published in Vancouver, Washington, U.S.
 Olympia Pioneer and Democrat, the first newspaper published in what is now the state of Washington, was known in its first two years (1852-53) as The Columbian.
 The Columbian Orator, a collection of political essays, poems, and dialogues first published in 1797
 Columbian Magazine, a monthly magazine published from 1786 to 1792

Transportation
 Columbian (B&O train), a passenger train operated by Baltimore and Ohio Railroad until 1971
 Columbian (MILW train), a passenger train which operated from 1911 to 1955
 Sternwheeler Columbian disaster, a sternwheeler lost in the worst accident in the Yukon River's history in 1906
 2-4-2, a type of steam locomotives, also called Columbian type

Other uses
 Columbian (typography), a name for 16-point type
 Columbian Period, the geological period 2060–1780 MYA named after the supercontinent Columbia
 An early alternative name for inhabitants of the United States
 Columbian Issue, a set of U.S. postage stamps marking the 1893 World Columbian Exposition
 World's Columbian Exposition, held in Chicago, Illinois, in 1893
 Columbian High School, Tiffin, Ohio
 Columbian School (disambiguation)
 Anything pertaining to the Knights of Columbus, (i.e. Columbian values)

See also

 British Columbia
 Pre-Columbian era
 
 
 Columbia (disambiguation)
 Columbiad (disambiguation)
 Columbiana (disambiguation)
 Columbina (disambiguation) 
 Columbine (disambiguation) 
 Colombia (disambiguation)
 Colombian (disambiguation)
 Colombiana (disambiguation)
 Colombina (disambiguation) 
 Colombino (disambiguation)
 Colombine (disambiguation)